This Charmed Life was released by The Burning Hell in the spring of 2010. It was available only on LP at the band's live shows or as a digital download.

Track listing
All songs by Mathias Kom

 Robert's Bad End
 Don't Let Your Guard Down
 70 Mile House
 Earthquake & Volcano 
 Last Winter
 100 Mile House 
 Northern Life
 The Things That People Make, Part 3
 150 Mile House

References
Album list on the Burning Hell's website
This Charmed Life page on Zunior.com

2010 albums
The Burning Hell albums